David Howard Adeney (3 November 1911 – 11 May 1994) was a British Protestant Christian missionary and university evangelist in Hunan, China and East Asia. He served with the China Inland Mission (CIM), InterVarsity Fellowship, and International Fellowship of Evangelical Students (IFES). In 1968 he founded the Discipleship Training Centre (DTC) in Singapore.

Life and Ministry
Born into a missionary family in Bedford, England on 3 November 1911, Adeney decided to become a missionary to China, following the path of his parents who had worked in Romania with the London Jews' Society. He was educated at Monkton Combe School, Somerset, UK, and completed an MA in theology and history at Queens' College, Cambridge, UK in 1933. Before moving to China in 1934, he spent a year at the CIM training school in London.

Between 1934 and 1914, he involved in church planting in rural villages in central China. and left for the United States due to the attack on Pearl Harbor. During his stay in the U.S., he worked in InterVarsity for a year, before moving back in China and being appointed as the associate general secretary of China InterVarsity Christian Fellowship.

In 1956, Adeney was appointed the associate general secretary for the Far East of IFES, whose office was located in Hong Kong. He led the student ministry until 1968 when the Cultural Revolution started.

He founded DTC in Singapore, an institution first initiated by the CIM, to train university graduates in theology.

He had various teaching experiences in theological institutes, including the China Graduate School of Theology and New College Berkeley, California.

He died on 11 May 1994 in Berkeley, California.

Family 
He married with CIM missionary Ruth Temple in 1938. Both of them moved to Henan for missionary after marriage.

Works

Primary Sources
 David H. Adeney, The Unchanging Commission (1955)
 David H. Adeney, Before Missionary Service (1967)
 David H. Adeney, China: Christian Students Face the Revolution (1973)
 David H. Adeney, China, the Church's Long March (1985)

Secondary Sources
 Carolyn Armitage, Reaching for the Goal: The Life Story of David Adeney (1993)

See also

Historical Bibliography of the China Inland Mission
OMF International

External links
Transcripts of interviews with David Adeney

References

1911 births
1994 deaths
English Protestant missionaries
Protestant missionaries in China
British expatriates in China
Christian writers
Alumni of Queens' College, Cambridge
People educated at Monkton Combe School